The Mi'kmaq language, or , is an Eastern Algonquian language spoken by nearly 11,000 Mi'kmaq in Canada and the United States; the total ethnic Mi'kmaq population is roughly 20,000.

Phonology
The phonemic inventory of Mi'kmaq is shown below.

Vowels

Consonants

The consonants of Miꞌkmaq can be divided into two groups: the obstruents , and the sonorants . The vowels of Miꞌkmaq are also counted as sonorants.

The obstruents have a wide variety of pronunciations. When they are located word-initially or next to another obstruent, they are voiceless. An example of each kind of pronunciation is given below.

Miꞌkmaq distinguishes between long and short vowels and consonants, the latter indicated in Listuguj by doubling the consonant. Beyond expanding in length, long consonants add a schwa when they precede other consonants.

However, such clusters are pronounced over separate syllables, with a schwa preceding the cluster; for instance,  is pronounced  while  is pronounced .

Grammar

Syntax
Miꞌkmaq uses free word order, based on emphasis rather than a traditionally fixed order of subjects, objects and verbs. For instance, the sentence "I saw a moose standing right there on the hill" could be stated "" (I saw him/there/on the hill/right-there/a moose/he was standing) or "" (I saw him/there/a moose/on the hill/right-there/he was standing); the latter sentence puts emphasis on the moose by placing  ('moose') earlier in the utterance. Miꞌkmaq, as a polysynthetic language, has verbs which usually contain the sentence's subject and object: for instance, the aforementioned  translates to 'I saw him'.

While it is thus difficult to classify Miꞌkmaq under traditional word order categories such as SVO or SOV, a more fixed aspect in the language comes in the morphology of its verbs. Certain areas of internal morphology of verbs in Miꞌkmaq have regular placement: for instance, when the aspect of a verb is included, it appears as the first prefix, while the negative marker always appears directly after the verb root. An example for both of these instances can be seen in the Miꞌkmaq verb , translated as 'they cannot get out': the prefix  marks the verb as being in the completive aspect, whereas the negative marker, w, appears directly after the verb root  ('the two move'). However, these solidly placed elements of verbs are paired with markers that can appear throughout the word, depending again on emphasis; animacy in particular can appear fluidly throughout verbs. In short, while a few specific aspects of Miꞌkmaq can be predicted, its syntax in general is largely free and dependent on context.

Mi'kmaq verbs are also marked for tense.

Nouns
Nouns in Mi'kmaq are either animate or inanimate. This is a common feature among Algonquian languages. The verbs change depending on the noun's animacy. For example: 

 – 'I see (inanimate noun)'

 – 'I see (animate noun)'

Writing system

Miꞌkmaq is written using a number of Latin alphabets based on ones devised by missionaries in the 19th century. Previously, the language was written in Miꞌkmaq hieroglyphic writing, a script of partially native origin. The Francis-Smith orthography used here was developed in 1974 and was adopted as the official orthography of the Míkmaq Nation in 1980. It is the most widely used orthography and is that used by Nova Scotian Mikmaq and by the Míkmaq Grand Council. It is quite similar to the "Lexicon" orthography, differing from it only in its use of the straight apostrophe  or acute accent  instead of the colon  to mark vowel length.

When the Francis-Smith orthography was first developed, the straight apostrophe (often called a "tick") was the designated symbol for vowel length, but since software applications incorrectly autocorrected the tick to a curly apostrophe, a secondary means of indicating vowel length was formally accepted, the acute accent. The barred-i  for schwa is sometimes replaced by the more common circumflex-i . 

In Listuguj orthography, an apostrophe marks long vowels as well as schwa, and the letter  is used instead of the letter .

It also ignores vowel length. The 19th-century orthography of Silas Tertius Rand, using characters from Isaac Pitman's Phonotypic Alphabet, is also given in the table below; this orthography is more complex than the table suggests, particularly as far as vowel quantity and quality is concerned, employing various letters such as 〈a〉, 〈à〉, 〈u〉, etc.

Number system

1–10

Miꞌkmaq uses a decimal numeral system.

On top of the basic structure, numbers in Miꞌkmaq must agree with the animacy of whatever they are counting: for instance, when speaking of two people,  is used, as opposed to the number used for two days, . The suffix  to denote the counting of animate subjects and the suffix  to denote the counting of inanimate subjects are common, but animacy-marking suffixes are somewhat fluid and vary by number and dialect.

Language revitalization efforts and teaching
The Mi'kmaq language possesses a degree of endangerment level of vulnerable under the UNESCO Atlas of the World's Languages in Danger scale. A level of vulnerable means the language may not be used consistently and instead the dominant language English is opted for. This also means it is still somewhat commonly spoken by younger generations or children of Mi'kmaq people. A lack of fluent Mi'kmaq speakers is due to the cultural genocide performed by the Canadian government through the introduction of the Canadian Indian residential school system. These schools under the notation of assimilation, forced Indigenous children to reject their cultural identity and language. These schools resulted in a significant number of children physically and mentally abused and without the means to speak their mother tongue.

Wagmatcook, Cape Breton, is undergoing significant efforts to revitalize the language. The community created a variety of children's books suited for a range of ages to develop Mi'kmaq language skills as children mature. The use of Mi'kmaq immersion schools in this area also increased the proficiency in the language for children and an improved attachment to their Indigenous identity. The immersion schools allowed children to learn their mother tongue, which increases the number of fluent speakers while still obtaining the dominant language. Community member educators also participated in a program to obtain a Certificate in Aboriginal Literacy Education that increased their fluency in the language.

Cape Breton University's Unamaꞌki College specializes "in Miꞌkmaq history, culture and education". As of 2013, "it has some 250 aboriginal students".

Also as of 2013, Lunenburg County, Nova Scotia's Miꞌkmaq Burial Grounds Research and Restoration Association has about forty students in its Miꞌkmaq language revitalization classes, and Miꞌkmaq greetings are becoming more common in public places.

In 2021, Emma Stevens, a member of the Eskasoni First Nation, recorded a cover version of the Beatles song "Blackbird" in the language to raise awareness and help in its revitalization efforts.

History and related languages

Miꞌkmaq is one of the Algic languages, a family that once spanned from a small portion of California across Central Canada, the Midwestern United States, and the northeastern coast of North America. Within this family, Miꞌkmaq is part of the Eastern Algonquian subgroup spoken largely along the Atlantic coast. It is closely related to several extant languages, such as Malecite-Passamaquoddy, Massachusett and Munsee as well as extinct languages like Abenaki and Unami. Beyond having a similar language background and sharing close geographic proximity, the Miꞌkmaq notably held an alliance with four other tribes within the Eastern Algonquian language group known as the Wabanaki Confederacy: in short, a history of long-term language contact has existed between Miꞌkmaq and its close linguistic relatives.

Even outside of the Eastern Algonquian subgroup, there exist similar cognates within the larger Algic family, such as the Cree   and the Miami-Illinois  .

Like many Native American languages, Miꞌkmaq uses a classifying system of animate versus inanimate words. The animacy system in general is common, but the specifics of Miꞌkmaq's system differ even from closely related Algic languages. For instance, in Wampanoag, the word for 'sun', is inanimate, but the word for 'earth', is animate, a fact used by some scholars to claim that the Wampanoag people were aware of the earth's rotation around an unmoving sun; however, in Miꞌkmaq, both the word for 'sun', and the word for 'earth', are animate, and parallel cultural knowledge regarding astronomy cannot be gleaned through the language. Much like grammatical gender, the core concept of animacy is shared across similar languages while the exact connotations animacy has within Miꞌkmaq are unique.

Many Acadian French and Chiac words are rooted in the Miꞌkmaq language, due to the Acadians and Miꞌkmaq living together prior to the Expulsion of the Acadians and the British colonization of Acadia; in French-speaking areas, traces of Miꞌkmaq can also be found largely in geographical names within regions historically that were occupied by the Miꞌkmaq people, including Quebec and several towns in Nova Scotia such as Antigonish and Shubenacadie. Moreover, several Miꞌkmaq words have made their way into colonizing languages: the English words caribou and toboggan are borrowings from Miꞌkmaq. The name caribou was probably derived from the Miꞌkmaq word  or  meaning 'the one who paws'. Marc Lescarbot in his publication in French in 1610 used the term caribou. Silas Tertius Rand translated the Miꞌkmaq word  as 'caribou' in his Miꞌkmaq-English dictionary (Rand 1888:98). 

The aforementioned use of hieroglyphic writing in pre-colonial Miꞌkmaq society shows that Miꞌkmaq was one of the few Native American languages to have a writing system before European contact.

Linguist Peter Bakker identified two Basque loanwords in Miꞌkmaq, presumably because of extensive trade contact between Basque sailors and Native Americans in the 16th century. The overall friendly exchanges starting in mid-16th century between the Miꞌkmaqs and the Basque whalers provided the basis for the development of an Algonquian–Basque pidgin with a strong Miꞌkmaq imprint, which was recorded to be still in use in the early 18th century.

Placenames
 Placenames ending in Miꞌkmaq , a word used by the natives to designate a fertile area like Passamaquoddy, Shubenacadie and Tracadie.
 Amqui, from Miꞌkmaq  (place of amusement or pleasure)
Aroostook County, from Mi'kmaq meaning 'beautiful/clear water'
Bouctouche, from Mi'kmaq  (pronounced Chebooktoosk)  meaning 'great little harbour'
 Causapscal, from Miꞌkmaq  (or), meaning 'stony bottom', 'swift water', or 'rocky point', likely referring to the rocky river bed of the Causapscal River.
 Gaspé Peninsula, from Miꞌkmaq  ('land recently acquired')
 Gaspé, Quebec,  ('land's end')
 Kouchibouguac, New Brunswick, from Miꞌkmaq  ('river of long tides')
 Paspébiac, from Miꞌkmaq , meaning 'split flats' or 'lagoon'.
 Quebec, from Miꞌkmaq 
 Restigouche, from Miꞌkmaq 
 Lac-Humqui, from Miꞌkmaq  (place of amusement or pleasure)
 Sayabec, from Miꞌkmaq 
 Shediac, from Miꞌkmaq , which means 'running far in' (in reference to the tide, which has a long range over the shallow, sandy beaches)

A 2012 book, by the Miꞌkmaq linguist Bernie Francis and anthropologist Trudy Sable, The Language of this Land, Miꞌkmaꞌki, "examines the relationship between Miꞌkmaq language and landscape."

Notes

References

Sources
 Maillard, M. l'abbé, redigée et mise en ordre par Joseph M. Bellenger, ptre. 1864. Grammaire de la langue mikmaque. Nouvelle-York, Presse Cramoisy de J.M. Shea. Reprinted 2007: Toronto: Global Language Press, 
 Delisle, Gilles L.; Metallic, Emmanuel L. 1976. Micmac Teaching Grammar. Preliminary version. La Macaza, Quebec: Manitou Community College.
 Pacifique, Père. 1939. Leçons grammaticales théoriques et pratiques de la langue micmaque. Sainte-Anne de Restigouche, P.Q. Reprinted 2007: Toronto: Global Language Press, 
 Rand, Silas Tertius. 1875. First reading book in the Micmac language. Halifax: Nova Scotia Printing Company (IA, GB). Reprinted 2006: Vancouver: Global Language Press, 
 Rand, Silas Tertius. 1888. Dictionary of the language of the Micmac Indians, who reside in Nova Scotia, New Brunswick, Prince Edward Island, Cape Breton and Newfoundland. Halifax: Nova Scotia Printing Company. Reprinted 1994: New Delhi & Madra
 s: Asian Educational Services,

External links

Miꞌkmaq Online Talking Dictionary
Internet Archive of "Míkmaq Language"
 Native Languages page on Míkmaq
 Chris Harvey's page on Míkmawísimk (Languagegeek)
 How to count in Miꞌkmaq
 OLAC resources in and about the Miꞌkmaq language

+
Eastern Algonquian languages
Indigenous languages of the North American eastern woodlands
First Nations languages in Canada
Languages of the United States
Lexis (linguistics)